Oakland Cemetery is located at 2 Saw Mill River Road in Yonkers, New York, next to St. John's Cemetery.  It was incorporated in 1875 and named Oakland Cemetery. In time graves from the Civil War filled the cemetery, as did those of other settlers of Yonkers who died.

The cemetery is divided into two halves with a hill separating the western lower half from the eastern upper half. The eastern half borders on the Saw Mill River Parkway, while the western half borders on Saw Mill River Road, where all of the entrances are located. There are two entrance gates that are large enough for a vehicle to enter through and one other smaller entrance gate for pedestrian visitors.

Within the confines of the cemetery trespassers have vandalized many of the graves leaving constant chores for the caretaker, who lives on the property, as noted on the Yonkers Ghost Investigators website under the section for haunted locations listed in the history of Oakland Cemetery.

Oakland Cemetery was established around 1783 to bury Revolutionary War soldiers, originally it was called St. John's Burial Grounds. The first burial in Oakland Cemetery was recorded on September 2, 1867. The name was changed to Oakland Cemetery in 1875. There are rumors of its being haunted by three ghostly females in white who are said to chase people out of the cemetery, on the hill separating the two halves at the cemetery's center.

The Glebe

Dutch-born merchant and trader Frederick Philipse, the first Lord of Philipsburg Manor bequeathed to his children “The Glebe” – a portion of land, for the use by ministers of the Church of England that were inducted into Saint John’s Church. The family of Tory sympathizers fled to England during the revolutionary war and their property was taken by attainder. Subsequently in 1866 that portion of yonkers was placed under debt by lawyer Leonard W. Jerome, who over the years parceled several farms in the area. he later redeemed the land not used by the cemetery and rectory and the Yonkers Cemetery Association took title. St. Johns Cemetery is accessible by entering thru Oakland Cemetery.

Notable interments

 Thomas Ewing Jr. (1829–1896), Union Army General
 William L. Heermance (1837–1903) a Union Army soldier in the American Civil War who received the Medal of Honor.
 Benjamin Franklin Isherwood (1822–1915), Union Civil War admiral
 Joe Lapchick (1900–1970), Saint John's University and New York Knicks basketball coach
  Dr. Charles Leale (1842–1932), a 23-year-old army surgeon who attended to Lincoln when he was shot at Ford's Theatre
 Elisha Otis (1811–1861), industrialist, inventor, and founder of Otis Elevator Company
 Hugh Francis Redmond – American CIA agent and veteran
 Earl Simmons (DMX) (1970–2021) rapper and actor.
 Nicholas Timasheff (1886–1970), sociologist, professor of jurisprudence and writer
 William W. Woodworth (1807–1873), US Congressman

References

External links
 
 
 

Geography of Yonkers, New York
Cemeteries in Westchester County, New York
1783 establishments in New York (state)